John Withypool (born by 1483), of Malmesbury, Wiltshire, was an English politician.

He was a Member of Parliament (MP) for Bossiney in 1547.

References

15th-century births
16th-century deaths
English MPs 1547–1552
People from Malmesbury
Members of the pre-1707 English Parliament for constituencies in Cornwall